Ili, ILI, Illi may refer to:

Abbreviations
 Irish Life International, part of Irish Life and Permanent
 Intuitive Logical Introvert, a personality type in socionics
 Influenza-like illness
 Iran Language Institute, a state-owned, non-profit organization for developing foreign language learning in Iran
 International Law Institute, a non-profit organization which teaches and publishes in the field of international development in the United States
 Indian Law Institute
 Intelligent Land Investments

People
 Ili (singer) (born 1998), or Emily Middlemas, Scottish singer-songwriter
 Ili (actress) (born 1993), Taiwanese actress

Placenames
 Ili (river), in China and Kazakhstan
 Ili Kazakh Autonomous Prefecture, in Xinjiang, China
 Yining City, seat of Ili Kazakh Autonomous Prefecture
 Ili, a name sometimes used in the past for the main city of the Ili region: first Huiyuan, later Suiding

Other
 Ili Turki language (ISO 639-3 ili), a Turkic language of China

See also
Ili Rebellion, a Soviet-backed revolt against the Kuomintang government of the Republic of China in 1944
Ba Ili, a sub-prefecture of Chari-Baguirmi, Chad
Illi (disambiguation)
Eli (disambiguation)
Ely (disambiguation)
Eley (disambiguation)
Yili (disambiguation) (the Pinyin spelling for the word that's transcribed as "Ili" in Wade–Giles)
Illy (disambiguation)